The year 1960 in television involved some significant events.
Below is a list of television-related events during 1960.



Events
February 10 – Jack Paar temporarily quits his television program in the United States because his monologue had been edited the night before, in favor of a three-minute news update. Parr walks out to the audience at the beginning of the show, announces that he is quitting, says "There's got to be a better way to make a living," and then walks off the stage. After network executives apologize personally, Parr resumed hosting the program a month later. His first show back starts with the words "As I was saying before I was interrupted...".

February–September – In a first for US Audiences, CBS broadcasts the 1960 Winter Olympics and Summer Olympics, on an exclusive basis, for $60,000. From Squaw Valley, American viewers are treated to 31 hours of coverage, which includes a mix of alpine skiing, figure skating, ice hockey, speed skating, and ski jumping. The Winter Olympic broadcast is hosted by Walter Cronkite while a young Jim McKay, who will go on to host ABC's Olympic coverage, does the Rome Games.
March 1 – Philippines's third television station DZTV-TV (now owned by the Intercontinental Broadcasting Corporation) started broadcasts on March 1, 1960, at 6:30 pm under the Inter-Island Broadcasting Corporation through the tri-media conglomerate of RMN-IBC-Philippine Herald owned by Andrés Soriano, Sr., the then owner of San Miguel Corporation.
March 2 – Lucille Ball files for divorce from Desi Arnaz, ending their 20-year marriage and the I Love Lucy franchise on CBS.
April 29 – RTSH started test transmissions at 6:00 pm, just only one day before an official launch.
June 1 – Auckland TV2, as predecessor for TVNZ 1 (Television New Zealand), a first television station in New Zealand, officially regular broadcasting service to start in Auckland.    
June 11 - CBS broadcasts the Monaco Grand Prix Formula 1 race (which took place on May 29th), possibly first broadcast of any F1 race in the United States.
June 20 – Nan Winton becomes the first national female newsreader on BBC television in the United Kingdom.
June 29 – The BBC Television Centre is opened in London.
July 21 – ERTU Al Oula, a member for Egyptian Radio and Television Union, a first television broadcasting service was launched in Egypt. 
July 31 – Telecuraçao is launched as the Netherlands Antilles' first television station, and also from of the Antilliaanse Television Company (ATM). 
August 20 – NRK1, a first television station in Norway, an officially regular broadcasting service to start in Oslo. 
September 24 – After thirteen seasons of entertaining American children, NBC children's show Howdy Doody ends with Clarabell the Clown saying the final two words of the show ("Goodbye Kids") after being assumed to only be mute. 
September 25 – First Japanese colour television broadcast.
September 26 – American presidential candidates John F. Kennedy and Richard M. Nixon debate live by television. The candidates behavior and/or appearance during the debate may have altered the outcome of the election. In addition to being the first presidential debates to be televised, the debates also marked the first time "split screen" images were used by a network.
October 1 – Argentine television station, El Trece, a first officially regular broadcasting service to start in Buenos Aires.
October 5 – KEYC-TV signed on October 5, 1960, just in time to broadcast the first game of the World Series that night from NBC.
October 12 – Inejiro Asanuma, chairman of the Japan Socialist Party, is assassinated by Otoya Yamaguchi using a wakizashi (samurai sword) during a political debate in Tokyo being taped by Japanese television broadcaster NHK.
November 4 – The University of Chile inaugurates its TV station over Channel 9 in Santiago, Chile. Its first broadcast marks the very first live broadcast of a TV show in Chile.
December 9 – The first episode of soap opera Coronation Street, made by Granada Television in Manchester, England, is aired on ITV. Intended as a 13-week pilot and disfavoured by critics, it has continued past its 10,000th episode in 2020 (its 60th anniversary year) as Britain's longest running soap.
December 31 – Norma Zimmer officially becomes Lawrence Welk's "Champagne Lady" on The Lawrence Welk Show.  She would remain with the show until it ended in 1982.

Undated
Frank and Doris Hursley start their soap opera writing career, taking the jobs of joint head writers for the series Search for Tomorrow.
Nearly 90% of homes in the United States now have a television set, and over one hundred million television sets are in use worldwide.

Programs/programmes

Debuts
January 9 – Baseball competition Home Run Derby from Wrigley Field (Los Angeles) begins a six-month run in syndication.
January 25 – Series The Kate Smith Show begins a six-month run on CBS.
February 7 – Series Overland Trail begins a four-month run on NBC. 
June 1 – TV One is initiated in Auckland. This is the first television transmission in New Zealand.
June 8 – Series Happy (1960–1961) and Tate (1960) both premiere on NBC.
June 13 – Series Deadline Midnight premieres on ITV (1960–1961).
June 28 –  Series Mess Mates premieres on ITV in UK (1960–1962).
September 6 – Series Coronado 9 begins a six-month run on NBC (1960–1961).
September 11 – Series Danger Man premieres on ITV in UK; broadcast also by CBS in USA (1960–1961, 1964–1966).
September 17 – Series Checkmate premieres on CBS (1960–1962).
September 18 – Series The Tab Hunter Show premieres on NBC (1960–1961).
September 23 – Series Dan Raven premieres on NBC (1960–1961).
September 27 – Series The Tom Ewell Show premieres on CBS (1960–1961).
September 29 – Series My Three Sons premieres on ABC (1960–1972).
September 29 – Series Outlaws premieres on NBC (1960–1962).
September 30 – Hanna Barbera's series The Flintstones debut on ABC (1960–1966).
October 1 – NBC commences airings of The Shari Lewis Show and Popeye the Sailor (Both 1960–1963)
October 3 – Series The Andy Griffith Show premieres on CBS (1960–1968).
October 4 – Series Stagecoach West premieres on ABC (1960–1961).
October 5 – Series My Sister Eileen premieres on CBS (1960–1961).
October 7 – Series Route 66 premieres on CBS (1960–1964).
October 10
Series Bringing Up Buddy premieres on CBS (1960–1961).
Series Klondike premieres on NBC (1960–1961).
October 11 – The Bugs Bunny Show, Looney Tunes' first television series (1960–2000).
October 12 – Series Peter Loves Mary premieres on NBC (1960–1961).
December 9 – Soap opera Coronation Street premieres on Granada Television in UK (1960-present).
Comedy show Radio Rochela (previously the La Cruzada del Buen Humor segment of El Show de las Doce) debuts on RCTV in Venezuela (1960–2010).

Television shows

1940s
Meet the Press (1947–present).
Howdy Doody (1947–1960).
Candid Camera (1948–present).
The Ed Sullivan Show (1948–1971).
Bozo the Clown (1949–present).
Come Dancing (UK) (1949–1995).
The Voice of Firestone (1949–1963).

1950s
The Jack Benny Show (1950–1965).
Men into Space (1959–1960).
Truth or Consequences (1950–1988).
What's My Line (1950–1967).
Love of Life (1951–1980).
I Love Lucy (1951–1960)
Search for Tomorrow (1951–1986).
Hallmark Hall of Fame (1951–present).
American Bandstand (1952–1989).
The Adventures of Ozzie and Harriet (1952–1966).
The Guiding Light (1952–2009).
The Today Show (1952–present).
This Is Your Life (US) (1952–1961).
Panorama (UK) (1953–present).
The Good Old Days (UK) (1953–1983).
Face the Nation (1954–present).
The Brighter Day (1954–1962).
The Milton Berle Show (1954–1967).
The Secret Storm (1954–1974).
The Tonight Show (1954–present).
Zoo Quest (UK) (1954–1964).
Alfred Hitchcock Presents (1955–1962).
Captain Kangaroo (1955–1984).
Cheyenne (1955–1962).
Dixon of Dock Green (UK) (1955–1976).
Gunsmoke (1955–1975).
Jubilee USA (1955–1960).The Lawrence Welk Show (1955–1982).This Is Your Life (UK) (1955–2003).Armchair Theatre (UK) (1956–1968).As the World Turns (1956–2010).Hancock's Half Hour (1956–1962).Opportunity Knocks (UK) (1956–1978).The Edge of Night (1956–1984).The Ford Show, Starring Tennessee Ernie Ford (1956–1961).The Price Is Right (1956–1965).What the Papers Say (UK) (1956–2008).Leave It to Beaver (1957–1963).The Pat Boone Chevy Showroom (1957–1960).The Army Game (UK) (1957–1961).Perry Mason (1957–1966).The Sky at Night (UK) (1957–present).Blue Peter (UK) (1958–present).General Motors Presents (Can) (1953–1956, 1958–1961)Grandstand (UK) (1958–2007).Peter Gunn (1958–1961).The Donna Reed Show (1958–1966).The Huckleberry Hound Show (1958–1962).Walt Disney Presents (1958–1961).Westinghouse Desilu Playhouse (1958–1960)Bonanza (1959–1973).Hawaiian Eye (1959–1963).Juke Box Jury (1959–1967, 1979, 1989–1990).The Bell Telephone Hour (1959–1968).The Twilight Zone (1959-1964, 1985–1988, 2002).This Man Dawson (1959–1960).The Rebel'' (1959–1961).

Ending this year

Births

See also
 1959–60 United States network television schedule
 1960–61 United States network television schedule

References